Harutaeographa orias is a moth of the family Noctuidae. It is found in Nepal, India, Pakistan, Indochina and Thailand.

Subspecies
Harutaeographa orias orias (northern India: Sikkim, West Bengal, Darjeeling)
Harutaeographa orias yoshimotoi Hacker & Hreblay, 1996 (Pakistan: Kashmir, northern India: Himachal Pradesh, Sikkim, Nepal, Indochina, Thailand: Chiang Mai)

References

Moths described in 1996
Orthosiini